Diana Plaza (born 12 June 1981) is a Spanish gymnast. She competed at the 1996 Summer Olympics.

References

External links
 

1981 births
Living people
Spanish female artistic gymnasts
Olympic gymnasts of Spain
Gymnasts at the 1996 Summer Olympics
Gymnasts from Madrid
20th-century Spanish women